Un Amor en Moisés Ville is a 2001 Argentine drama film directed by Daniel Barone and written by Antonio Ottone. It stars Victor Laplace, Cipe Lincovsky, Malena Figo, Lautaro Delgado and Jean Pierre Reguerraz. It premiered in Argentina on April 12, 2001.

Cast 
 Víctor Laplace as David 
 Cipe Lincovsky   
 Malena Figo   
 Lautaro Delgado   
 Jean Pierre Reguerraz   
 Noemí Frenkel  
 Luisana Lopilato as Guinevere

External links 
 

Argentine drama films
2001 films
2000s Spanish-language films
2000s Argentine films